Chrysocentris eupepla is a moth in the  family Glyphipterigidae. It is known from Madagascar.

References

Glyphipterigidae
Moths of Madagascar
Moths of Africa
Moths described in 1930